The Barons is a 2009 Belgian comedy film directed by Nabil Ben Yadir. It was written by Yadir, Laurent Brandenbourger and Sébastien Fernandez. It premiered on 2 September 2009 at the Festival International du Film Francophone de Namur. The film was nominated for six Magritte Awards, winning Best Supporting Actor for Jan Decleir.

Cast
 Nader Boussandel as Hassan
 Mourade Zeguendi as Mounir
 Mounir Ait Hamou as Aziz
 Julien Courbey as Franck Tabla
 Jan Decleir as Lucien
 Fellag as 'R.G.'
 Édouard Baer as Jacques
 Amelle Chahbi as Malika
 Melissa Djaouzi as Milouda
 Salah Eddine Ben Moussa as Kader
 Jean-Luc Couchard as Ozgür
 Virginie Efira as the artist

References

External links

2009 films
2009 comedy films
2000s French-language films
2000s Dutch-language films
2000s Arabic-language films
Belgian comedy films
French comedy films
Films set in Belgium
Films shot in Brussels
2009 multilingual films
Belgian multilingual films
French multilingual films
2000s French films